Mannukkul Vairam is a 1986 Indian Tamil-language film directed by Manoj Kumar in his debut and produced by Kovaithambi. The film stars Sivaji Ganesan, Sujatha, Rajesh and Murali. It was released on 12 December 1986.

Plot 
Chittu returns to her hometown of Mettupatti after being raised by her grandmother in a neighbouring town. The two most powerful and rich men in town are brothers Thavasi, known as Periyavar, and Virumandi, known as Chinnavar. Periyavar believes in equal justice above all else and is highly respected in the village while Chinnavar believes is his own caste-superiority. Periyavar has a very young grandchild, Chinnathayee, who's been widowed after a child marriage.  Chittu's parents, Velappa and Velaiamma, launder the town's clothes. Chittu finds it difficult to adjust to the town's rigid caste hierarchy after being raised with more freedom by her grandmother. She also clashes with her classmate Mayilsamy, Chinnavar's son. He constantly teases and humiliates her due to her caste. Chittu eventually convenes the panjayath to ask for justice and Periyavar punishes Mayilsamy. Chittu intervenes as she's worried his punishment will only breed more resentment and retaliation. In the aftermath of this incident, Mayilsamy realises his errors and soon falls in love with Chittu while Periyavar grows closer to Velappa's family. Chinnavar is incensed by Chittu's arrogance and what he believes is Velappa rising above his station. When Periyavar is called away, Chinnavar, the town's doctor and a few others force Velappa to work during the town's Pongal festival celebrations. Velappa is burned terribly in an accident while he's working. Chittu begs the doctor for help but is rebuffed by him and Chinnavar. Vellappa dies in agony and, in anger, Chittu yells at Chinnavar and his friends for their cruelty. In retaliation, he drives Chittu and Vellamma out of town. Years later, the two women return to the town when Chittu becomes the town's new doctor. Some of the townspeople have changed significantly, however some things are still very much the same. Chittu must face Chinnavar's continued hatred and the ramifications this has on many of those she cares about.

Cast 

Sivaji Ganesan as Thavasi aka Periyavar
Sujatha as Velaiamma
Rajesh as Velappa
Murali as Mayilsamy
Ranjini as Chittu
Vinu Chakravarthy as Virumandi aka Chinnavar
Goundamani as Esakki
Senthil as Sembattai
Ganthimathi as Mayilsamy's Mother
Kovai Sarala
Pandiyan as Bhoomi
Vani Viswanath as Chinnathayee (adult)
Vinodhini as Chinnathayee (young)
Baby Lakshmi
Keerthi
Devi
Madurai Saroja
Vijaya
Nagalakshmi
K. K. Soundar
Ramnath
Suryakanth
Krishnamoorthy
Jayapal
Kullamani
Pasi Narayanan
Vellai Subbaiah
Periya Karuppu Thevar
M. L. A. Murugesh
Karisai Amalan
Rajamani
Singamuthu

Production 
Manojkumar, brother-in-law of director Bharathiraja made his directorial debut with this film. Producer Kovaithambi was impressed with the story narrated by Manojkumar and he immediately narrated the story to Sivaji Ganesan who agreed to act in the film.

Soundtrack 
Soundtrack was composed by Devendran in his debut. The song "Pongiyathe Kadhal" was well received and Devendran revealed it was based on a song which he composed while working as music teacher for a school.

Reception 
Mannukkul Vairam was released on 12 December 1986. The Indian Express praised Manoj Kumar's "treatment of caste discrimination is [..] subdued". Kovaithambi said the film ran for 50 days in theatres, and though it was not that successful, it gave him the satisfaction of working with Sivaji Ganesan.

References

External links 
 

1980s Tamil-language films
1986 directorial debut films
1986 films
Films about the caste system in India
Films scored by Devendran